Switzerland competed at the 2014 Summer Youth Olympics, in Nanjing, China from 16 August to 28  
August 2014.

Archery

Switzerland qualified a male archer from its performance at the 2014 European Archery Youth Championships.

Individual

Team

Athletics

Switzerland qualified four athletes.

Qualification Legend: Q=Final A (medal); qB=Final B (non-medal); qC=Final C (non-medal); qD=Final D (non-medal); qE=Final E (non-medal)

Boys
Track & road events

Girls
Track & road events

Field events

Beach Volleyball

Switzerland qualified a team by being the highest ranked nation not yet qualified.

Diving

Switzerland qualified two quotas based on its performance at the Nanjing 2014 Diving Qualifying Event.

Golf

Switzerland qualified one athlete based on the 8 June 2014 IGF World Amateur Golf Rankings.

Individual

Team

Gymnastics

Artistic Gymnastics

Switzerland qualified one athlete based on its performance at the 2014 European MAG Championships and another athlete based on its performance at the 2014 European WAG Championships.

Boys

Girls

Shooting

Switzerland was given a wild card to compete.

Individual

Team

Swimming

Switzerland qualified four swimmers.

Boys

Girls

Mixed

Table Tennis

Switzerland qualified one athlete based on its performance at the Road to Nanjing series.

Singles

Team

Qualification Legend: Q=Main Bracket (medal); qB=Consolation Bracket (non-medal)

Tennis

Switzerland qualified one athlete based on the 9 June 2014 ITF World Junior Rankings.

Singles

Doubles

References

2014 in Swiss sport
Nations at the 2014 Summer Youth Olympics
Switzerland at the Youth Olympics